The 27th Senate of Puerto Rico is the upper house of the 19th Legislative Assembly of Puerto Rico. Its counterpart  in the lower house is the 31st House of Representatives of Puerto Rico.

The body will meet from January 2, 2021, to January 1, 2025, under the Federal Oversight and Management Board established by PROMESA.

For the first time in the Constitutional period starting in 1952, there was no clear majority party for the body, with the plurality coming from the Popular Democratic Party (PPD in Spanish) at 12 seats of the 14 needed to have a majority when the body is at 27 members.

The body is counterparted by the 31st House of Representatives of Puerto Rico in the lower house. It has given advice and consent to the nominees put forth by Pedro Pierluisi.

Leadership

Current leadership

Vote for President of the Senate

Members

Non-officers

Commissions 
A notable departure from previous senates is the addition of more commission presidencies from outside the largest party in the chamber. While the 26th Senate had an independent senator as president of the Commission for the Development of Community Initiatives, José Vargas Vidot, this current body assigned one commission presidency to each delegation, as may be better seen in this table of standing commissions.

Standing and Special Commissions 

|+ 
! scope=col style="text-align: left" | Name
! scope=col style="text-align: left" | President
! scope=col style="text-align: left" | Vice President
! scope=col style="text-align: left" | Secretary
|-
| Agriculture and Natural Resources
| |José Luis Dalmau Santiago
| |Ada García Montes
| |Ramón Ruiz Nieves
|-
| Appointments
| |José Luis Dalmau Santiago
| |Gretchen Marie Hau Irizarry
| |Rubén Soto Rivera
|-
| Compliance and Restructuring
| |Marially González Huertas
| |Rosamar Trujillo Plumey
| |Ada García Montes
|-
| Cooperativism
| |Rosamar Trujillo Plumey
| |Gretchen Marie Hau Irizarry
| |Migdalia González Arroyo
|-
| Community Initiatives, Mental Health, and Addiction
| |José Vargas Vidot
| |Rosamar Trujillo Plumey
| |Elizabeth Rosa Vélez
|-
| Development of the East Region
| |Rosamar Trujillo Plumey
| |Javier Aponte Dalmau
| |Albert Torres Berríos
|-
| Development of the North Region
| |Rubén Soto Rivera
| |Elizabeth Rosa Vélez
| |Albert Torres Berríos
|-
| Development of the South Central Region
| |Ramón Ruiz Nieves
| |Marially González Huertas
| |Albert Torres Berríos
|-
| Development of the West Region
| |Migdalia González Arroyo
| |Ada García Montes
| |Rubén Soto Rivera
|-
| Economic Development, Essential Public Services, and Consumer Affairs
| |Gretchen Marie Hau Irizarry
| |Ada García Montes
| |Juan Zaragoza Gómez
|-
| Education, Tourism, and Culture
| |Ada García Montes
| |Elizabeth Rosa Vélez
| |Albert Torres Berríos
|-
| Ethics
| |Gretchen Marie Hau Irizarry
| |Marially González Huertas
| |Ramón Ruiz Nieves
|-
| Government
| |Ramón Ruiz Nieves
| |Juan Zaragoza Gómez
| |Albert Torres Berríos
|-
| Health
| |Rubén Soto Rivera
| |Rosamar Trujillo Plumey
| |Ada García Montes
|-
| Human Rights and Labor Affairs
| |Ana Irma Rivera Lassén
| |Gretchen Marie Hau Irizarry
| |Rubén Soto Rivera
|-
| Innovation, Telecommunication,Urbanism and Infrastructure
| |Elizabeth Rosa Vélez
| |Albert Torres Berríos
| |Ramón Ruiz Nieves
|-
| Internal Affairs
| |Marially González Huertas
| |Javier Aponte Dalmau
| |Migdalia González Arroyo
|-
| Life and Family Affairs
| |Joanne Rodríguez Veve
| |Elizabeth Rosa Vélez
| |Rosamar Trujillo Plumey
|-
| Municipal Affairs and Housing
| |Migdalia González Arroyo
| |Gretchen Marie Hau Irizarry
| |Ramón Ruiz Nieves
|-
| Poverty Eradication
| |Elizabeth Rosa Vélez
| |Rosamar Trujillo Plumey
| |Migdalia González Arroyo
|-
| Public Safety and Veteran Affairs
| | Thomas Rivera Schatz (PNP)
| |Albert Torres Berríos
| |Juan Zaragoza Gómez
|-
| Rules and Calendar
| |Javier Aponte Dalmau
| |Gretchen Marie Hau Irizarry
| |Ada García Montes
|-
| Social Welfare and Elderly Affairs
| |Rosamar Trujillo Plumey
| |Elizabeth Rosa Vélez
| |Migdalia González Arroyo
|-
| Treasury, Federal Relations, and the Oversight Board
| |Juan Zaragoza Gómez
| |Ramón Ruiz Nieves
| |Ada García Montes
|-
| Veterans' Affairs
| |José Luis Dalmau
| |Zoé Laboy Alvarado
| |Carlos J. Rodríguez Mateo
|-
| Women's Affairs
| |Migdalia González Arroyo
| |Elizabeth Rosa Vélez
| |Gretchen Marie Hau Irizarry
|-
| Youth, Recreation and Sports
| |Albert Torres Berríos
| |Ada García Montes
| |Gretchen Marie Hau Irizarry
|-
| Special Commission on Legislative Monitoring of the Special Education Program of the Deparment of Education
| | Mª de Lourdes Santiago Negrón
|
|
|-
| Special Commission on Poverty Eradication
| |Elizabeth Rosa Vélez
| |Rosamar Trujillo Plumey
| |Migdalia González Arroyo
|-
| style="text-align:left;" colspan="4"| Sources

Notes

References 

2017 in Puerto Rico
26